The 1952 Idaho Vandals football team represented the University of Idaho in the 1952 college football season. The Vandals were led by second-year head coach Raymond "Babe" Curfman and were members of the Pacific Coast Conference. Home games were played on campus at Neale Stadium in Moscow, with one game in Boise at old Bronco Stadium at Boise Junior College.

In the home opener against Oregon on October 4, Idaho outplayed the visitors for 56 minutes, but gave up two late touchdowns and lost 

The Vandals suffered a second straight loss in the Battle of the Palouse with neighbor Washington State, falling  at Rogers Field in Pullman on  The previous two editions had been competitive, with a  tie in 1950 and  battle in Moscow  The loss prevented the first winning season for Idaho football since 1938.

Idaho regrouped and concluded the season with two convincing wins over Montana at home and Oregon State in Corvallis in the last varsity game played at Bell Field.

Following his playing days, Anderson was a head coach for the Vandals in baseball (1958–66) and basketball (1966–74); he was also an assistant athletic director (1971–74, 1982–94).

Schedule

 One game was played on Friday (at night vs. Santa Clara in San Francisco)

All-conference

No Vandals were on the All-PCC team; honorable mention on defense were end Ray Lewis, tackle Don Ringe, and linebacker Bob Holder.

NFL Draft
One senior from the 1952 Vandals was selected in the 1953 NFL Draft:

One junior was selected in the 1954 NFL Draft:

One sophomore was selected in the 1955 NFL Draft:

 Often incorrectly listed as a UI Vandal, tackle Norm Hayes (1954 draft, #217) played at the College of Idaho in Caldwell.
List of Idaho Vandals in the NFL Draft

References

External links
Gem of the Mountains: 1953 University of Idaho yearbook – 1952 football season 
Go Mighty Vandals – 1952 football season
Official game program: Idaho at Washington State – November 1, 1952
Idaho Argonaut – student newspaper – 1952 editions

Idaho
Idaho Vandals football seasons
Idaho Vandals football